A pram  is a small utility dinghy with a transom bow rather than a pointed bow. This type of pram provides a more efficient use of space than does a traditional skiff of the same size. The Mirror and Optimist sailboats are examples of this form. Modern prams are often 8 to 10 feet long and built of plywood, fibreglass, plastic or aluminum. They are usually oar powered. The Norwegian pram is commonly made of solid timber with much fore and aft rocker with a U-shaped cross section. In New Zealand and Australia the most common pram is an arc or v bottom rowboat commonly made of 6mm marine plywood often sealed with paint and/or epoxy resin. In the past often used as a tender; it has been replaced in this role by the small inflatable.

There is an unrelated type of ship called "pram" or "pramm".

Dinghies